Robert Langdon is a fictional character.

Robert Langdon may also refer to:

Robert Bruce Langdon (1826-1895), American businessman and politician
Robert E. Langdon Jr. (1918-2004), American architect
Robert Adrian Langdon, Australian academic

See also
Robert Langton (disambiguation)